The Ford F-Series is a series of light-duty trucks marketed and manufactured by Ford since the 1948 model year.  Slotted above the Ford Ranger in the Ford truck model range, the F-Series is marketed as a range of full-sized pickup trucks.  Alongside the F-150 (introduced in 1975), the F-Series also includes the Super Duty series (introduced in 1999), which includes the heavier-duty F-250 through F-450 pickups, F-450/F-550 chassis cabs, and F-600/F-650/F-750 Class 6-8 commercial trucks. The most popular version of the model line is the F-150 pickup truck, currently in its 14th generation. From 1953 to 1985, the entry-level F-Series pickup was the  ton F-100. The F-150 has a long-running high-performance off-road trim level introduced for 2010, the (SVT) Raptor currently consisting of three generations.

The F-Series trucks have been developed into a wide range of design configurations during their production run.  Alongside medium-duty trucks and "Big Job" conventional trucks (the forerunners of the Ford L-series), the model line has been sold as a chassis-cab truck and a panel van (a predecessor of the Ford E-Series).  The F-Series has also served as the basis for multiple full-sized Ford SUVs, including the Ford Bronco, Ford Expedition/Lincoln Navigator, and Ford Excursion.  The F-Series has been marketed by its three North American brands, as Mercury sold the model line as the Mercury M-Series in Canada from 1948 to 1968; Lincoln sold the F-Series during the 2000s as the Blackwood and the later Mark LT.

Since 1977, the F-Series has remained the best-selling pickup truck line in the United States; it has been the highest-selling vehicle overall since 1981.  The F-Series is the best-selling truck in Canada for over fifty years.  As of the 2018 model year, the F-Series generated $41 billion in annual revenue for Ford. By January 2022, the F-Series models have been sold 40 million units. Currently, Ford manufactures the F-Series in four facilities in the United States.

First generation (1948–1952) 

The first-generation F-Series pickup (known as the Ford Bonus-Built) was introduced in 1948 as a replacement for the previous car-based pickup line introduced in 1942. The F-Series was sold in eight different weight ratings, with pickup, panel truck, cab-over engine (COE), conventional truck, and school-bus chassis body styles.

Second generation (1953–1956) 

For the 1953 model year, Ford introduced a second generation of the F-Series trucks. Increased dimensions, improved engines, and an updated chassis were features of the second generation. In another change, the model nomenclature of the F-Series was expanded to three numbers; this remains in use in the present day. The half-ton F-1 became the F-100 (partially influenced by the North American F-100 Super Sabre); the F-2 and F-3 were combined into the -ton F-250, while the F-4 became the one-ton F-350. Conventional F-Series trucks were F-500 to F-900; COE chassis were renamed C-Series trucks.

While the cabs, doors, radiator support, inner fenders, and hoods are the same from 1953 to 1956 F-100 and F-250s (the fenders varied on F-250, F-350, and F-500, and long boxes were only available on the F-250), in 1956, the cab underwent a major revision. Centered around a wraparound windshield, the cab was given new doors, a redesigned dashboard, and an (optional) panoramic rear window. In line with Ford cars, the 1956 F-Series offered seat belts as an option.

Third generation (1957–1960) 

Introduced in 1957, the third generation F-Series was a significant modernization and redesign. Front fenders became integrated into the body, and the new Styleside bed continued the smooth lines to the rear of the pickup.

The cab-over F-Series was discontinued, having been replaced by the tilt-cab C-Series.

In 1959, Ford began in-house production of four-wheel drive pickups.

Fourth generation (1961–1966) 

Ford introduced a dramatically new style of pickup in 1961 with the fourth-generation F-Series. Longer and lower than its predecessors, these trucks had increased dimensions and new engine and gearbox choices. Additionally, the 1961–1963 models offered an optional unibody design with the cab and bed integrated. The traditional separate cab/bed was offered concurrently. The unibody proved unpopular, and Ford discontinued the option after the 1963 model year.

In 1965, the F-Series was given a significant midcycle redesign. A completely new platform, including the "Twin I-Beam" front suspension, was introduced, and continued to be used until 1996 on the F-150, and still is currently on the F-250 and F-350 4x2. Additionally, the Ranger name made its first appearance in 1965 on a Ford pickup; previously, the Ranger denoted a base model of the Edsel, but starting in 1965, it was used to denote a high-level styling package for F-Series pickups.

Fifth generation (1967–1972) 

Introduced in 1967, the fifth-generation F-series pickup was built on the same platform as the 1965 revision of the fourth generation. Dimensions were increased, engine options were expanded, and plusher trim levels became available during the fifth generation's production run.

Changes during the 67-72 run were minimal, but notable. In 1968, to comply with FMVSS (Federal Motor Vehicle Safety Standards) marker lights were added to the rear bedside and front sides of the hood. 1970 saw a switch from metal bar style grillwork to the plastic eggcrate style.

Sixth generation (1973–1979) 

The sixth-generation F-series was introduced in 1973. This version of the F-series continued to be built on the 1965 fourth-generation's revised platform, but with significant modernization and refinements, including front disc brakes, increased cabin dimensions, full double-wall bed construction, and increased use of galvanized steel.

The FE engine series was discontinued in 1976 after a nearly 20-year run, replaced by the more modern 335 and 385 series engines.

In 1975, the F-150 was introduced in between the F-100 and the F-250  to avoid certain emission control restrictions. For 1978, square headlights replaced the previous models' round ones on higher trim package models, such as Lariat and Ranger, and in 1979 became standard equipment. Also for 1978, the Ford Bronco was redesigned into a variant of the F-series pickup; 1979 was the last year that the 460 engine was available in a half-ton truck.

Seventh generation (1980–1986) 

The seventh-generation F-Series was introduced for 1980, marking the first ground-up redesign of the model line since 1965. Alongside an all-new chassis, the pickup trucks received a completely new body. While distinguished by straighter body lines, the aerodynamics of the exterior were optimized to improve fuel economy. Sharing their cab structure with F-Series pickup trucks, medium-duty trucks (F-600 through F-800) underwent their first redesign since 1967.

The powertrain line of this generation underwent multiple revisions through its production. At its launch, the engine line was largely carried over from 1979. While the 7.5 L V8 was dropped entirely, a 4.2 L V8 was introduced as the smallest V8 engine. For 1982, a 3.8 L V6 became the standard engine for the F-100. For 1983, to improve the fuel efficiency of the model line, the M-Series engines (the 5.8 L 351M and 6.6 L 400 V8s) were dropped; the latter was replaced by the return of the 7.5 L V8. In response to low demand and poor performance, the 4.2 L V8 and 3.8 L V6 were phased out in 1982 and 1983, respectively. For the F-250 and F-350, a 6.9 L diesel V8 (sourced from a partnership with International Harvester) became an option for 1983. For 1984, an "H.O." version of the 5.8 L V8 was introduced. The 5.0 L V8 was fitted with fuel injection as standard equipment for 1986, becoming the first such engine in an American-market pickup truck. The 4.9 L was fuel injected on 1987 models.

In line with the previous generation, the SuperCab and four-door crew cab made their return in 1980 and 1982, respectively. For the first time, a dual-rear-wheel version of the F-350 was offered as a pickup truck.

For 1982, Ford revised the badging of the model line, replacing the "FORD" hood lettering with the Ford Blue Oval grille emblem, a design that remains in use on all F-Series trucks today (except the Raptor). The same year, the Ranger trims was dropped; the name shifted to the Ford Ranger compact pickup (replacing the Ford Courier). After 30 years as the smallest F-Series truck, the F-100 was dropped after 1983, eliminating model overlap with the F-150 (and payload overlap with the Ranger).

This generation was the final version of the F-Series to offer a three-speed, column-shifted manual transmission; it is also the second-to-last vehicle sold in the United States with this configuration.

Eighth generation (1987–1991) 

The eighth-generation F-Series was introduced for 1987 as a major revision of the 1980–1986 generation. While the cab was carried over, many body panels were revised, including a completely new front fascia; the interior also underwent a redesign. The long-running Flareside bed design was retired, with all examples produced with Styleside beds.

Following the 1986 transition of the 5.0 L V8 to fuel injection, the 4.9 L I6 followed suit for 1987, with the 5.8 L and 7.5 L engines doing so for 1988; the F-Series became the first American pickup truck model line sold without carbureted engines. The same year, the 6.9 L diesel V8 was increased in size to 7.3 L. Following the discontinuation of the three-speed manual, a five-speed manual became standard equipment (a four-speed remained a special-order option until 1992). For 1989, an E4OD four-speed automatic (overdrive version of the C6 heavy-duty three-speed) was introduced.

Slotted between the F-350 and F-600, the F-Super Duty was introduced in 1987; an ancestor of the current F-450/F-550, the F-Super Duty was designed exclusively for chassis cab applications.

Ninth generation (1992–1997) 

The ninth-generation F-Series was introduced for 1992 as the second redesign of the 1980 F-Series architecture. Adapting design elements from the newly introduced Explorer and redesigned E-Series and Ranger, the F-Series received a slightly lower hoodline, rounding the front fenders, bumper, and grille. The F-Series received a driver-side airbag starting in the 1994 model year.

After a six-year hiatus, the FlareSide bed made its return, becoming a submodel of the F-150. To appeal to younger buyers, the bodywork of the FlareSide bed was modernized, adapting the fenders of a dual rear-wheel F-350 to a single rear-wheel chassis. To commemorate the 75th anniversary of the first Ford factory-produced truck (the 1917 Ford Model TT), Ford offered a 75th-anniversary package on its 1992 F-series, consisting of a stripe package, an argent-colored step bumper, and special 75th-anniversary logos. In response to the Chevrolet 454SS pickup truck, Ford introduced the SVT Lightning, powered by a 240 hp 5.8 L V8.

For 1993, a turbocharger became available on the 7.3L "IDI" diesel. In the middle of the 1994 model year (referred to as "1994.5"), International replaced the IDI with the new 7.3 L T444E turbo diesel, the first engine branded as a Ford PowerStroke. While sharing its predecessor's displacement, the engine was an entirely new design.

For the 1997 model year, the ninth generation was gradually phased out of production; the F-150 was replaced by the tenth-generation F-Series (see below), with the F-250 (rebranded as the F-250 Heavy Duty) and F-350 remaining in production through the 97 model year. Introduced mid 1998 (as 99 models), the larger F-Series trucks (and the F-Super Duty) were replaced by Ford Super Duty pickups.

Tenth generation (1997–2004) 

For the 1997 model year, Ford made a substantial change to the F-Series range of trucks, splitting its pickup line into two vehicle families. From the 1970s to the 1990s, pickup trucks had transitioned in usage. Alongside vehicles designed exclusively for work use, the market segment saw a major increase in demand for dual-purpose vehicles for both work and personal use, effectively serving as a second car. To further expand its growing market share, Ford sought to develop vehicles for both types of buyers, repackaging the F-150 in a more contemporary design (as a larger version of the Ranger) while retaining the heavier-duty F-250 and F-350 for customers interested in a work-use vehicle.

The tenth-generation F-Series was introduced in January 1996 as a 1997 model. Initially released solely as the F-150, a higher-GVWR F-250 was released in 1997. The model line was marketed alongside its predecessor, pared down to the F-250HD and F-350; for 1999, these were replaced by the Super Duty trucks.

In the most extensive redesign of the F-Series in 17 years, the chassis received fully independent front suspension, ending the use of Twin I-Beam front axles. Sharing only the transmissions with its predecessor, the 1997 F-150 received a range of engines new to the F-Series, including a 4.2 L V6 and 4.6 L V8; a 5.4 L V8 was added during 1997. Introduced in the full-sized Crown Victoria/Grand Marquis/Town Car sedans, the Modular/Triton V8 was the first overhead-camshaft engine  to be installed in a full-sized pickup truck.

Distinguished by its rounded exterior, the tenth generation was again offered in standard- and extended-cab (SuperCab) configurations. To improve rear-seat access, a rear-hinged third door (curbside) was introduced for the SuperCab; following its popularity, the SuperCab received a fourth door for 1999. For 2001, the F-150 became the first "-ton" truck offered as a crew cab with full-sized doors; produced with a slightly shortened bed, the F-150 SuperCrew shared the length of a standard-bed SuperCab.

The SVT Lightning made its return for 1999, powered by a supercharged version of the 5.4 L V8; over 28,000 were produced from 1999 to 2004. For 2002, Lincoln-Mercury introduced the Lincoln Blackwood, the first Lincoln pickup. Sharing the front bodywork of the Lincoln Navigator SUV and the same cab and chassis as the F-150 SuperCrew, the Blackwood was designed with a model-exclusive bed and was sold only in black. Due to very poor sales, the model line was discontinued after 2002.

For 1999, Ford redesigned the F-250 and F-350, introducing them as the first generation of the Ford F-Series Super Duty model line. While remaining part of the F-Series, the Super Duty trucks were designed with a different chassis, powertrain, and body design, as they are developed for heavier-duty work use. For 2000, the Super Duty line was expanded to include the medium-duty truck (F-650/F-750) series, designed in a joint venture with Navistar International.

Eleventh generation (2004–2008) 

For the 2004 model year, the F-150 was redesigned on an all-new platform, which has a fully boxed-in frame and introduced rear shocks to mount outside of the frame for decreased wheel hop and improved ride quality. This new body style kept the fully independent front suspension introduced in the last generation, but added vacuum-driven front wheel hubs for the four-wheel drive (4WD) versions. The previous generation had full-time connected front axles. The improvement saves fuel and by default goes into a wheel-locked position. Should a failure occur in the vacuum solenoid, system, or hoses, the wheel hub defaults to a 4WD position to keep from leaving a driver stranded. Internally, a three-valve version of the 5.4 L V8 was introduced and replaced the previous two-valve version. Externally, the 11th-generation model was different from its predecessor, with sharper-edged styling; a major change was the adoption of the stepped driver's window from the Super Duty trucks. Regardless of cab type, all F-150s were given four doors, with the rear doors on the regular cab providing access to behind-the-seat storage. Ford also introduced additional variants of the F-150. The FX4 Off-Road package available since the 2002 model year became its own trim level. A sportier version of the F-150 became available as STX, replaced by FX2 Sport in 2007.

From 2005 to 2008, Lincoln-Mercury dealers sold this version of the F-150 as the Lincoln Mark LT, replacing the Blackwood.

In late 2007 for the 2008 model year, the Super Duty trucks were given an all-new platform. While using the same bed and cabin as before, these are distinguished from their predecessors by an all-new interior and a much larger grille and head lamps. Previously available only as a chassis-cab model, the F-450 now was available as a pickup directly from Ford.

Twelfth generation (2009–2014) 

The 12th-generation F-150 was introduced for the 2009 model year as an update of the Ford full-sized truck platform. Similar to its predecessor, these trucks are distinguished by their Super Duty-style grilles and Edge-style headlights; standard-cab models again have two doors instead of four. The Flareside bed was continued until 2010, dropped along with the manual gearbox; outside of Mexico, the Lincoln Mark LT was replaced by the F-150 Platinum. A new model for 2010 included the SVT Raptor, a dedicated off-road pickup.

In 2010, Ford shifted its electronics from a general electric module base to the computerized and programmable body control module, allowing for fewer parts differences and programmable upgrade options from the dealer or factory. In 2011, Ford reintroduced the 5.0 in the F-Series with its new 5.0 Coyote dual overhead cam TiVVT engine with 360 hp.

As part of a major focus on fuel economy, the entire engine lineup for the F-150 was updated for the 2011 model year. Along with the new V8 engine, the F-150 gained a new 3.7 L base V6 engine, and a powerful twin-turbocharged 3.5 L V6, dubbed EcoBoost by Ford. An automatic transmission became the only version. Other modifications include the addition of a Nexteer Automotive electric power steering system on most models.

A recent study conducted by iSeeCars.com and published on the Ford Motor Company website listed the Ford F-250 Super Duty as the longest-lasting vehicle and Expedition, Explorer, and F-150 among the top-20 longest-lasting vehicles.

Thirteenth generation (2015–2020) 

The 13th-generation Ford F-Series was introduced for the 2015 model year. Largely previewed by the Ford Atlas concept vehicle at the 2013 Detroit Auto Show, the new design marked several extensive changes to the F-Series design. In the interest of fuel economy, Ford designers reduced curb weight of the F-150 by nearly 750 pounds, without physically altering its exterior footprint. To allow for such a massive weight reduction, nearly every body panel was switched from steel to aluminum (with the exception of the firewall); the frame itself remains high-strength steel. To prove the durability of the aluminum-intensive design, during the development of the 13th-generation F-Series, Ford entered camouflaged prototypes into the Baja 1000 endurance race (where the vehicles finished). The 2015 F-150 was the first pickup truck with adaptive cruise control, which uses radar sensors on the front of the vehicle to maintain a set following distance from the vehicle ahead of it, decreasing speed if necessary.

The 3.7 L V6 was dropped, replaced by a 3.5 L V6 as the standard engine, with a 2.7 L EcoBoost V6 added alongside the 3.5 L EcoBoost V6. While the 6.2 L V8 was withdrawn, the 5.0 L V8 continued as an option, with a six-speed automatic as the sole transmission.

For the 2017 model year, the 3.5L EcoBoost 2nd gen was debuted along with the new 10-speed 10R80 transmission.  The 2.7 L EcoBoost and 5.0L Coyote remained the same and both continued to be mated with the 6-speed 6R80 transmission.

For the 2018 model year, the Ford F-150 underwent a midcycle redesign, being revealed at the 2017 New York International Auto Show. Following the introduction of the 2017 Super Duty model line, the F-Series (F-150 through F-550 and Ford Raptor) are again manufactured using a common cab (for the first time since 1996). For 2018, the F-150 shifted from the long-running three-bar design used on Ford trucks to the two-bar design that debuted on the 2017 Super Duty model line. The powertrain underwent several revisions, as the 3.5 L V6 was replaced by a 3.3 L V6 mated to a six-speed transmission. The 2.7 L EcoBoost V6 engine and 5.0 L V8 engines were fitted with a 10-speed automatic (from the Raptor) and stop-start capability (previously only from the 2.7 L EcoBoost). In 2018, a PowerStroke diesel engine was fitted to the F-150 for the first time, as Ford introduced a 250 hp  440 lb-ft of torque 3.0 L turbocharged V6 (from the "Lion" lineup of engines shared by PSA Peugeot Citroën and Jaguar Land Rover).

Safety and driver-assistance features improved and added for the 2018 model year include Pre-Collision Assist with Pedestrian Detection and Adaptive Cruise Control with Stop and Go.

The SuperCrew Cab version of the 2018 F-150 reclaimed an IIHS Top Safety Pick rating.

Fourteenth generation (2021–present)

The 14th-generation Ford F-Series was introduced for the 2021 model year through a live presentation streamed over the Internet on June 25, 2020. Despite sharing a strong visual resemblance to the 13th generation, the 2021 F-150 underwent a redesign of 92% of its parts, carrying over only its cab and pickup box structure.

The powertrain line is largely carried over from the previous generation, with a 3.3-liter V6, 2.7-liter and 3.5-liter EcoBoost twin-turbo V6s, a 5.0-liter V8, and a 3.0-liter diesel V6. Dubbed PowerBoost, an optional gasoline-electric hybrid powertrain was introduced for the first time in a Ford light truck, pairing an electric motor with the 3.5-liter V6. The six-speed automatic is dropped, with all engines paired to a 10-speed automatic. The 5.0-liter V8 receives a new cylinder deactivation system, called Variable Displacement Engine  technology, similar to GM's Active Fuel Management and Chrysler's Multi-Displacement System.

Along with exterior design changes to enhance aerodynamics, many changes were made to the interior, adding fold-flat front seats and larger touchscreens (including a digital instrument panel); as an option, Active Drive Assist was offered as a driver-assistance system.

A new F-150 Raptor was announced in January 2021, and features a 3.5-liter V6 gasoline engine.

A fully electric version of the F-150 was unveiled on May 19, 2021: the Ford F-150 Lightning.

Special models 
Throughout its production, variants of the Ford F-Series has been produced to attract buyers. While these variants primarily consist of trim packages, others are high-performance versions while other variants were designed with various means of improving functionality.

Unibody F-Series (1961–1962) 
For 1961 into part of the 1963 model year, the Ford F-Series was offered with a third body configuration, integrating the Styleside bed with the cab. With the pickup bed stampings welded directly to the cab before both assemblies were mounted to the frame, the design simplified the assembly and paint process (the configuration was similar to that of the Ford Ranchero). Following a poor market reception, the unibody pickup bed design was withdrawn during the 1963 model year.

Specials (1962–1979) 
From 1961 to 1979, Ford offered several Special option packages for the F-Series, typically designed for owners with specific uses for their vehicles. For 1961, the Camper Special option package was introduced; designed for owners of slide-in truck campers, the option package featured prewiring for the camper, heavy-duty transmission and engine cooling, and a larger alternator. For 1968, Ford introduced the Contractor's Special, and Farm and Ranch Special, which featured toolboxes and heavier-duty suspension. The Explorer Special was introduced as a lower-priced variant of the Ranger trim. The Trailer Special was offered with trailer brake controller, heavy-duty radiator, transmission cooler, and tow hitch.

In 1980, the Special option packages were withdrawn as part of the F-Series redesign, while a number of features continued as stand-alone options; the Explorer continued as a variant of the Ranger trim through the 1986 model year.

F-150 Nite (1991–1992) 
Sold from 1991 to 1992 on the Ford F-150 XLT Lariat, the Nite special edition was a monochromatic option package, featuring black paint and trim with a multicolor accent stripe. For 1991, it was exclusive to the regular-cab F-150; for 1992, it was available on all bodystyles of the F-150 and introduced on the Ford Bronco.

The Nite edition was available with two-wheel drive or four-wheel drive with either the 5.0L or 5.8L V8; it also included a sport suspension and alloy wheels on 235/75R15 white-letter tires.

Eddie Bauer (1994–1996) 
For 1994, Ford introduced the Eddie Bauer trim level for the F-150. In a fashion similar to the same trim packages on the Aerostar, Bronco, and Explorer/Bronco II, it consisted of outdoors-themed interior trim with two-tone exterior paint.

SVT Lightning

1993–1995 

Introduced as a 1993 model, the Ford SVT Lightning is a high-performance version of the F-150 that was produced by the Ford Special Vehicle Team (SVT). Intended as a competitor for the Chevrolet 454SS, the SVT Lightning was derived from the F-150; to improve its handling, extensive modifications were made to the front and rear suspension and frame. Powered by a 240 hp version of the 5.8L V8, the Lightning used a heavy-duty 4-speed automatic transmission from the F-350 (normally paired with the 7.5L V8 or 7.3L diesel V8). While slower in acceleration than the GMC Syclone, the Lightning retained nearly all of the towing and payload capacity of a standard Ford F-150. Produced from 1993 to 1995, the first-generation SVT Lightning was withdrawn as Ford readied the 1997 Ford F-150 for sale.

1999–2004 

After a three-year hiatus, Ford released a second generation of the SVT Lightning for the 1999 model year. In line with its 1993–1995 predecessor, the second-generation Lightning was based on the F-150 with a number of suspension modifications; in a design change, all examples were produced with a FlareSide bed. In place of a model-specific engine, the second-generation was powered by a supercharged version of the 5.4L V8 from the F-150, producing 360 hp (increased to 380 hp in 2001). As before, the higher-output engine was paired with a heavier-duty transmission from the F-350 pickup.

For the 2004 redesign of the Ford F-150, the SVT Lightning was not included, leaving 2004 as the final year for the model line. While of an entirely different design focus from the SVT Lightning, the SVT/Ford Raptor is the succeeding generation of high-performance Ford F-Series pickup trucks.

Harley-Davidson Edition (2000–2011) 
From 2000 to 2011, the Harley-Davidson Edition was an option package available on the F-150. Primarily an appearance package featuring monochromatic black trim, from 2002 to 2003, the edition included a slightly detuned version of the supercharged 5.4L V8 engine from the SVT Lightning. In 2003, a 100th Anniversary Edition was produced for F-150 SuperCrew trucks. For 2004, the Harley-Davidson option package became available for F-250/F-350 Super Duty trucks. After 2008, the option package adopted many of the options featured from the Platinum trim level, featuring leather seating produced from materials reserved for Harley-Davidson biker jackets.

For 2012, the Harley-Davidson Edition was replaced by the Limited trim level, retaining a monochromatic exterior appearance (shifting past motorcycle-themed trim).

SVT Raptor (2010–2014); Raptor (2017–present) 
For 2010, Ford introduced its second high-performance truck, the SVT Raptor. In contrast to the enhanced on-road performance of the SVT Lightning, the SVT Raptor is a focused towards off-road use, in line with that of a Baja 1000 racing truck. While a road-legal vehicle, many design modifications of the Raptor were made to improve its off-road capability, with the vehicle featuring a model-exclusive suspension with long-travel springs and shocks. The Raptor shares only its cab with a standard F-150; to accommodate its larger tires, the Raptor is fitted with wider front fenders, hood, and pickup bed. Initially produced as a SuperCab, a Raptor SuperCrew was introduced late in the 2010 model year. For the first time on a Ford vehicle in North America since 1983, the word "Ford" was spelled across the grille of the SVT Raptor in place of the Ford Blue Oval badge.

For 2010, the SVT Raptor was powered by a 310 hp 5.4L V8; a 411 hp 6.2L V8 (from the F-150 Platinum and Super Duty trucks) became optional, replacing the 5.4L V8 for 2011. A six-speed automatic is the sole transmission paired with both engines.

After a two-year hiatus, the second-generation Ford Raptor (the SVT prefix was removed) was introduced for the 2017 model year. Derived from the thirteenth-generation F-Series, the Ford Raptor shifted to an aluminum body. Again produced as a high-performance off-road vehicle, the Raptor is produced in SuperCab and SuperCrew configurations, with long-travel suspension specific to the vehicle. As a design theme, the second-generation Raptor does not carry a Ford Blue Oval grille badge, instead spelling out "Ford" across the grille.

To improve fuel economy and reduce weight, the 6.2L V8 was replaced by a 450-horsepower and 510 Ft-Lbs torque High Output 3.5L twin-turbocharged EcoBoost V6, paired with a 10-speed automatic transmission.

For 2019, Ford made upgrades to enhance the off-road capability of the Raptor series truck line. They introduced new FOX Live Valve Shocks. The new shocks auto adjust the suspension's compression dampening based on the terrain via a live sensor electrically controlled solenoid valves. This new Terrain Management System works with sensors in the body to adjust as the truck is driving. The new Trail control for 2019 also adds adaptive cruise control for off-road use.

Ford also added an optional Blue Accent Package with Recaro front racing seats for the 2019 model year.

F-150 King Ranch (2001–present) 
In 2001, Ford's marketing department leveraged a partnership with the 825,000-acre King Ranch in south Texas, which is the largest ranch in both Texas and the United States and which operates a large fleet of Ford trucks. The truck was emblazoned with the King Ranch's Running W brand and upholstered in saddle leather. It was the industry's first full-size lightweight pickup truck with a full rear passenger compartment and 4 full-size doors, becoming the SuperCrew cab. Along with the Limited and Platinum, the King Ranch continues to comprise the luxury end of the F-150 spectrum. 40% of King Ranch F-150 sales are in Texas, Ford's largest pickup truck market.

F-150 Platinum (2009–present) 

Introduced for 2009, Platinum is a luxury-oriented trim of the Ford F-150. Effectively replacing the Lincoln Mark LT in the United States and Canada (though its production continued through 2014 in Mexico), the Platinum adopted many of the luxury features and content from the Mark LT with more subdued exterior styling (the Platinum was fitted with an eggcrate grille similar to early models of the Ford Expedition).

In 2013, Ford began use of the Platinum trim for Super Duty trucks, from the F-250 to the F-450 pickup trucks. Until 2016, the Platinum trim was an add-on package to a Super Duty that was ordered as a Lariat. 2017 saw the Platinum become a separate trim level.

F-150 Tremor (2014-2015, 2021-present) 
For the 2014 model year, Ford introduced the Tremor model of the F-150. The Tremor was released as a high-performance sport truck for street truck enthusiasts. The regular-cab Tremor is based on the style of the FX Appearance Package with the 3.5 Liter EcoBoost engine and a 4.10 rear axle. The interior uses a console-mounted shifter, custom bucket seats and a flow-through center console not found in any other F-150. The Tremor is available in both 4x2 and 4x4. Both options feature an electronic locking rear differential and customized suspension. There were 2,230 Tremors built.

Ford reintroduced the Tremor with the 14th Generation F-150 in 2021 as a standalone model, slotted between the FX4 and Raptor, with an updated 3.5 Liter EcoBoost, producing 400 horsepower and 500 Ft-Lbs. of torque paired with a 10-speed automatic transmission. The Tremor is available only as a SuperCrew model with a 5 1/2-foot bed with three specific trim levels (Base, Mid, and High) that offer updated luxury and convenience items. The updated Tremor features a revised shock and suspension system, unique external styling kit, custom seats, vented hood, powder-coated running boards, and various skid and bash plates. In the 2022 model year, Ford also offered the Tremor with the 5.0L Coyote engine, producing 400 horsepower and 410 Ft-Lbs. of torque. Both engines are paired with Ford's 10-speed automatic transmission. The trim levels were reduced to Standard and High.

Ford F-150 Lightning 

At the 2019 Detroit Auto Show in January 2019, Ford announced the intention to produce a fully-electric light pickup.

Ford unveiled the truck, called the F-150 Lightning, on May 19, 2021. It intends to begin production in the spring of 2022. Ford received 44,500 orders in the first two days after the announcement, and a further 25,000 in the next two days after that. The low-end configuration has ,  range, and its smaller battery allows a  payload. Both models have  of torque, full-time four-wheel-drive, independent rear suspension, and currently come in a crew-cab configuration only, with 5.5' bed. The active suspension provides real-time load weighing function. Like Tesla, the Ford F-150 Lightning has over-the-air software updates, and a significant software driving aids which allow limited hands-off highway driving, but fall short of full self-driving. The F-150 Lightning provides household-oriented V2G power, which can meet the electrical needs of a typical American home for three to ten days, and supply up to 9.6 kW of power through eleven 120V and 240V electrical outlets distributed around the truck.

As of May 27, 2021, Ford has begun discussing the other vehicles beyond the F-series, such as the Expedition and Navigator, which will be underpinned by their full-size EV truck chassis, as well as the smaller chassis which will be used for the Bronco, Explorer, and Aviator.

F-100 Eluminator

At the 2021 SEMA show in Las Vegas, Ford unveiled the F-100 Eluminator concept truck, an electromod restoration of a 1978 F-100 repowered with the electric vehicle drivetrain and front and rear suspension subframes taken from the Mustang Mach-E GT Performance Edition. The vehicle was designed by Ford Performance and built by several aftermarket shops under contract to Ford to advertise the availability of the Eluminator crate motor replacement for classic vehicles. "Eluminator" is an allusion to the Ford 5.2L "Aluminator" Modular V8 engine.

Ford contributed front and rear sub-frames, which were already fitted with electric traction motors, and a battery pack from the Mach-E production line. Roadster Shop built a custom ladder frame to support the vintage body, attach the subframes, and carry the battery underneath the cab and bed. McCue-Lane Electric Race Cars (MLe) handled final integration of the driveline components. Major interior components also were taken from the Mach-E and used in the "electromod" truck. Brand X Customs handled the restoration of the body, finishing it in Avalanche Gray with copper-colored trim. The  wheels were built by Forgeline.

At the time of release, Ford Performance announced they also were planning to develop battery systems, controllers, and traction inverters to make a complete drop-in EV drivetrain replacement available commercially for interested parties. Ford Performance engineer Brian Novak said that since the engineering drawings were finished, a second example could be built for "McLaren money, not Bugatti money", which Motor Trend estimated to be .

Variants

Medium-duty trucks 

For most of its production, the F-Series was sold in a medium-duty conventional truck configuration alongside the traditional pickup trucks. Beginning in 1948 with the 1 ton F-5 (later F-500), the medium-duty trucks ranged up to the F-8 (F-800). Prior to the 1957 introduction of the Ford C-Series tilt-cab, the medium-duty range was offered as both a conventional and in a COE (cabover) configuration.

Following the introduction of the fifth-generation F-Series in 1967, the medium-duty trucks were designed separately from the pickup truck range. Although remaining part of the F-Series range, the medium-duty trucks shared only the cab and interior with the F-Series pickup trucks. Since 1967, the cab design has changed only in 1980 and in 2000. Redesigned on an all-new chassis, the 2016 F-Series medium-duty trucks retain an updated version of the 2000–2015 F-650/F750 cab.

The medium-duty F-Series served as the donor platform for the B-Series cowled bus chassis produced from 1948 to 1998. Produced primarily for school bus bodies, the B-Series was discontinued as part of the sale of the Ford heavy-truck line to Freightliner in 1996.

Heavy-duty trucks 
Above its medium-duty truck ranges, the Ford F-Series was used as a heavy-truck chassis during its early production. In 1951, Ford debuted its "Big Job" line, denoting the F-8 conventional. In 1958, the "Super Duty" and "Extra Heavy Duty" replaced the Big Job trucks, marking the debut of the Super Duty V8 engine line. In 1963, the N-Series became the first short-hood conventional built by Ford, replacing the F-900 Super Duty/Extra Heavy Duty. Although based on an all-new chassis and separate bodywork, the cab was sourced from the F-Series.

In 1970, Ford introduced the L-Series "Louisville" line of conventional trucks, moving all heavy truck development away from the F-Series. The L-Series/Aeromax would remain in production through 1998, as Ford exited the North American heavy-truck segment. Outside North America, Ford builds the Ford Cargo, and Ford F-MAX.

Vans 

From 1948 until 1960, the F-Series was produced in a panel van configuration; in contrast to General Motors, Ford never offered a passenger "carryall" variant (competing against the Chevrolet/GMC Suburban or the International Travelall). For 1961, the panel van was discontinued, largely replaced by the Econoline compact van.

From 1968 to the present day, the Econoline/Club Wagon/E-Series vans have shared a degree of mechanical commonality with the F-Series pickup trucks (during the 1970s, some body components were shared). While no longer produced for retail sale, the E-Series still shares its engines and transmission with the Ford Super Duty trucks.

Export 

As of 2018, outside of the United States, Canada, and Mexico, the Ford F-150 is officially sold in most Caribbean countries (except Trinidad and Tobago, Saint Kitts and Nevis and Cuba), Suriname, Ecuador, Peru, Chile, the Middle East (including Afghanistan), Iceland, China, Cambodia, the Philippines, Angola, Burkina Faso, Cameroon, Cape Verde, Democratic Republic of Congo, Ethiopia, the French Overseas Collectivities of French Polynesia and New Caledonia, Gabon, Ghana, Ivory Coast, Liberia, Nigeria, Senegal, Sierra Leone, Madagascar, the Dutch territories of Aruba, Curaçao, Saint Maarten and the British overseas territory of the Cayman Islands. The SVT Raptor is sold in the United States, Canada, Mexico, the Middle East (including Afghanistan), China, Ecuador, Chile and Peru. Both are available in LHD only.

In Mexico, the F-150 (XLT and higher trim levels) is called the "Ford Lobo" (Ford Wolf) while the F-150 SVT Raptor is called the "Ford Lobo Raptor". The F-150 XL remains as F-150 XL.

There is a strong grey market presence of Ford F-Series trucks around the world, most notably in Europe, China, South Korea, and usually driven by wealthy car enthusiasts, as the higher end trim models are the most sought-after versions. In Australia they are popular with those wanting to tow heavier trailers and caravans.

In Bolivia, Ford F-series truck are imported from the United States. F-150 single, super cab and crew cab are available with short and long bed. F-series Heavy Duty like F-250, F-350 are available in Super Cab and Crew cab with long bed, but the F-450 is available only in a chassis version. The F-150 Raptor is available, too.

In the United Kingdom, most imported Ford F-Series trucks are the F-150 model in LHD, and usually the higher-end four door versions.

Motorsports 

The truck won the San Felipe 250 eight times between 1999 and 2007.

The F-Series represents Ford in the NASCAR Craftsman Truck Series. Greg Biffle won the 2000 NASCAR Craftsman Truck Series Championship, being the only Ford driver to do so. Ford also won the Manufacturers' Championship in 1999 and 2000.

Drivers such as Roger Norman and Larry Roeseler won the Primm 300 in 2003, 2007 and 2008.

In 2008, Ford announced its entrance into the Baja 1000 class-eight race for moderately modified, full-size pickups. The driver of record was Steve Oligos, supported by co-drivers Randy Merritt, Greg Foutz, and Bud Brutsman. The vehicle was built with collaboration between the Ford Special Vehicle Team (SVT), Ford Racing, and Foutz Motorsports, Inc. The Ford F-150 SVT Raptor R completed the 2008 41st Tecate SCORE Baja 1000 race in 25.28:10, and ranked third in its class. Tavo Vildosola and Gus Vildosola won the event in 2010.

In the Best in the Desert race series, an F-150 SVT Raptor R completed the "Terrible's 250" race, placing second overall in the class 8000.

In January 2010, a single Raptor SVT (No. 439), driven by Chilean driver Javier Campillay, competed in the Argentina-Chile Dakar Rally. However, the pickup was unable to finish due to a catch-up crash with another car in the middle of the road during stage seven. In January 2011, two Raptors started in the Argentina-Chile Dakar Rally in Buenos Aires, with Campillay driving the more reliable Raptor (No. 375), and American female driver Sue Mead driving a T2 Raptor (No. 374). Mead crossed the finish line in Buenos Aires and won the "super production" class, the first North American class win in Dakar history. Campillay was unable to finish the 12th stage after losing time due to mechanical failure during the 11th stage, which led to his disqualification for failing to reach the race camp by the designated deadline.

Police usage

Ford F-150s are commonly used as police trucks. They are primarily used to patrol off-road areas such as mountains, forests, flooded areas, shorelines, and beaches, where a standard police car has difficulty maneuvering. In addition, they are often used for transporting SWAT teams, and can even have facilities to securely detain and transport a small number of suspects. Other common police uses include equipping the truck with cages for animal control or using them to transport mounted units or police boats.

Awards and recognition 
The Ford F-150 has won numerous awards; in 2009 alone, it received:
Motor Trend 2009 Truck of the Year Award
 2009 Best Redesigned Vehicle from Kelley Blue Book's kbb.com
 Top honors as the "truck of Texas" as well as the "best luxury pickup" for the 2009 F-150 King Ranch from Texas Auto Writers Association
 Automotive Excellence Award in the Workhorse Category from Popular Mechanics
 "Top safety pick" from the Insurance Institute for Highway Safety for its standard safety technology: safety canopy side curtain air bags and AdvanceTrac with roll stability control
 Residual Value Award from Automotive Leasing Guide (ALG) for retaining the highest percentage of its original price among 2009 full-size light-duty pickups at the end of a conventional three-year lease, based on ALG projections
Motor Trend's Truck Trend Top 5 Pickups from Specialty Equipment Market Association (SEMA) for 2009 Ford F-150 Heavy Duty DeWalt Contractor Concept
 Accessory-Friendly Pickup Design Award from SEMA
 "Best overall half-ton pickup" from PickupTrucks.com

Sales

See also 
Ford F-Series (medium duty)
Ford Super Duty

References

External links 

 

 
F-Series
All-wheel-drive vehicles
Flexible-fuel vehicles
Motor vehicles manufactured in the United States
Pickup trucks
Rear-wheel-drive vehicles
Vehicles introduced in 1948